Under the Hood Café was a coffee house located at 17 South College Street in Killeen, Texas. It provided services for soldiers located at Fort Hood, one of the largest American military installation in the world. Under the Hood Café was first managed by Cynthia Thomas,  but later managers were Kyle Wesolowski, Lori Hurlebaus and Malachi Muncy. Under the Hood is a project of the Fort Hood Support Network. It bills itself as being a safe place for local soldiers to spend off-duty time at, where the normal issues of rank are irrelevant. It is also the host of the monthly Killeen Poetry Slam.

The coffeehouse closed its doors in 2015 but the Fort Hood Support Network still exists as a project that has received a construction permit from the FCC to operate a low-power FM radio station serving the Fort Hood-Killeen community.

Anti-war activities
Under the Hood Cafe describes itself as being part of the tradition of The Oleo Strut, a famous GI coffee house during the Vietnam war. The cafe continues in this tradition by hosting the Fort Hood chapter of Iraq Veterans Against the War, which holds its meetings at Under the Hood. In 2009, the coffeehouse was the staging area for the first anti-war marches in Killeen since the Vietnam War.  It also provided support for two war resisters, Victor Agosto and Travis Bishop, in their public campaigns against the War in Afghanistan. The cafe has also been outspoken in encouraging combat veterans to be tested and treated for TBI (traumatic brain injury), and PTSD (post-traumatic stress disorder)

In August 2010 members of the IVAW took part in protesting the deployment of the 3rd ACR as the troops were leaving for Iraq. During the protest at least one person tried to stand in front of the buses carrying the troops.

Response to Fort Hood shootings
On November 6, 2009, the Fort Hood chapter of IVAW and the Under the Hood Cafe issued a joint statement in response to the Fort Hood shooting, which reads in part:

Major Nidal Malik Hasan, a soldier who had not deployed to Iraq, Afghanistan or any combat zone, was later convicted of the shootings.

See also

 Coffee Strong
 GI Coffeehouses

References

 http://www.kdhnews.com/news/story.aspx?s=33565

External links
 

GI Coffeehouses
2015 disestablishments in Texas
Killeen, Texas
Fort Hood
Restaurants in Texas